Varabiev is a surname. Notable people with the surname include:

Antrop Varabiev, Romanian sprint canoeist
Lipat Varabiev (born 1951), Romanian sprint canoeist

Romanian-language surnames